HMS Unseen (P51) was a Royal Navy U-class submarine built by Vickers-Armstrong at Barrow-in-Furness.

Career
Unseen spent most of her wartime career in the Mediterranean, where she sank the Italian merchants Zenobia Martini, Le Tre Marie and Rastello (the former Greek Messaryas Nomikos), the Italian naval auxiliary Sportivo, the German auxiliary submarine chaser UJ-2205 (the former French Le Jacques Coeur), the Italian sailing vessel Fabiola, the German minelayer Brandenburg (the former French Kita), the German nightfighter direction vessel Kreta (the former French Ile de Beauté) and the German barge F 541.  Unseen also destroyed the wreck of the German merchant Macedonia and a salvage barge.

Unseen also launched unsuccessful attacks against the Italian merchant Saluzzo (the former French Tamara), and what is identified as an Italian Capitani Romani class cruiser.

Unseen survived the war and was scrapped at Hayle in September 1949.

References

External links
 Interview with Captain Michael "Tubby" Crawford DSC, RN, who commanded HMS Unseen from 1942 to 1944

 

British U-class submarines
Ships built in Barrow-in-Furness
1942 ships
World War II submarines of the United Kingdom